Nicolette Goulet  (June 5, 1956 – April 17, 2008) was a Canadian-American film, television and musical theatre actress.

Biography
Goulet was born in Toronto, Ontario, Canada, the only child of singer-actor Robert Goulet and his first wife, Louise Longmore. She had two half-brothers, Christopher and Michael, from her father's second marriage, to singer-actress Carol Lawrence. Goulet was educated in New York at Marymount College, where she starred in several plays. At age 18, she landed the role of Corey in a production of Barefoot in the Park.

From there she went on to the television soap opera Ryan's Hope, playing Mary Ryan Fenelli in 1979. She was the fourth actress to portray the character. She also appeared on three other such daytime serialized drama: Search for Tomorrow as Kathy Parker Phillips Taper #2 from 1980 until 1982; As the World Turns as Casey Reynolds in 1984; and Guiding Light as Meredith Reade Bauer from 1987 to 1989.

She starred in two motion pictures, Whispers of White and Calhoun County, and in the Off-Off-Broadway play Sweet Song of the Trumpets. Other theater roles included a Baltimore, Maryland, production of Lillian Hellman's Another Part of the Forest in 1984, and the musicals I Love My Wife (1982, The Little Theatre on the Square, Sullivan, Illinois) and Romantic Comedy (1982).

Personal life
On April 17, 2008, less than six months after her father's death, Goulet died in Las Vegas, Nevada, as a result of breast cancer. At the time of her death, she was divorced from husband Tim Fowlar, whom she had married on August 30, 1992. She had three children: Jordan, Solange and Dee.

References

External links

 
 

1956 births
2008 deaths
People from the Las Vegas Valley
Actresses from Toronto
American film actresses
American soap opera actresses
American musical theatre actresses
American television actresses
Canadian emigrants to the United States
Canadian film actresses
Canadian soap opera actresses
Canadian musical theatre actresses
Canadian television actresses
Deaths from breast cancer
Deaths from cancer in Nevada
Musicians from Toronto
20th-century American women singers
20th-century American singers
20th-century American actresses
20th-century Canadian women singers
21st-century American women